Georges Vedel (5 July 1910 – 21 February 2002) was a French public law professor from Auch, France.

Biography
Vedel is credited as being "the reviser of public law [in France]."  He was a faculty member of universities in Poitiers, Toulouse, and Paris, at both Panthéon-Assas University.  He was a published author, having written manuals on constitutional and regulatory law, publications which both left their mark on generations of French legal experts. Vedel was most well known for his theory of the constitutional bases present in regulatory law, a theory that united the field of public law in France.

Georges Vedel was a member of the Constitutional Council of France from 1980 to 1989.  He was nominated to this position by Valéry Giscard d'Estaing, the president of France at the time. He is a fervent European and a well-known supporter of the federalist theories.

Vedel was elected to seat 5 of the Académie Française on 28 May 1998, replacing René Huyghe.

Published works
An Essay on the Cause Notion of Regulatory Law. (1934)
Constitutional Law. (1949)
Regulatory Law. (1958)

Reports
Long-term Perspectives of French Agriculture. (published by La Documentation française, 1969.)
Growth of Competency in the European Parliament. (published by Journal des Communautés européennes, 1972.)
Financing Public Business. (published by J.O.C.E.S., 1976.)
Management of Press Businesses. (published by J.O.C.E.S., 1979.)
Presidency of the Consultative Committee for the revision of the Constitution.  (published by La Documentation française, 1993.)

References 

1910 births
2002 deaths
People from Auch
20th-century French lawyers
Members of the Académie Française
Member of the Academy of the Kingdom of Morocco
Academic staff of Paris 2 Panthéon-Assas University
Grand Croix of the Légion d'honneur
Grand Cross of the Ordre national du Mérite
University of Toulouse alumni
Scholars of constitutional law